I'll Be Gone may refer to:
"I'll Be Gone" (Linkin Park song), 2012
"I'll Be Gone" (Spectrum song), 1971
"I'll Be Gone" (Avicii song), 2015
"I'll Be Gone", a song by Dwight Yoakam from his 1986 album Guitars, Cadillacs, Etc., Etc.
"I'll Be Gone", a song by Tom Waits from his 1987 album Franks Wild Years
"I'll Be Gone", a song by Clint Black from his 1989 album Killin' Time